P/ Thillayadi Muslim Maha Vidhyalaya (Tamil: தில்லையடி முஸ்லிம் மகா வித்தியாலயம்) is a provincial school located at Thillayadi, Puttalam, Sri Lanka. It was founded by M.M Ahamed Kabeer in 10th of February 1978. It is registered as School Census No 18077. 

According to Department of Examination, Thillayadi MMV is ranked 3rd place in Puttalam District and 69th place in Island wide for the Commerce Stream on 2019 which Schools with less than 20 candidates. While on Arts Stream 7rd place in Puttalam District and 87th place in Island wide.

References

1978 establishments in Sri Lanka
Educational institutions established in 1978
Provincial schools in Sri Lanka
Schools in Puttalam District